Dutton Hotel, Stagecoach Station is located on Jolon Road in Jolon, California. What remains are ruins of an adobe inn that was established in 1849. The Dutton Hotel was a major stagecoach stop on El Camino Real in the late 1880s. The landmark was listed on the National Register of Historic Places on October 14, 1971.

History

It was a one-story rectangular adobe inn built by Antonio Ramirez in 1849 as a home for miners and travelers. It later became a major Stagecoach Station on the route for travelers between San Francisco and Los Angeles in the late 19th-century. The site was well supplied by water and was a natural setting for vaqueros to hold annual cattle round ups.

From the gold rush days of 1849, settlers took the Jolon land believing it was part of the public domain provided by the United States government. However, Faxon Atherton said that the settlers were squatting on his land and sent notice to evict them, including Lieutenant George Hough Dutton (1825–1905) and Captain Thomas Theodore Tidball (1827-1913). The hotel changed owners several times before 1876, when H.C. Dodge sold it to Dutton and Tidball for $1,000 and 100 acres. Dutton added a second adobe story, wood-frame structures at either end, and a store. The first floor had two dining rooms, one for guests and the other for ranch hands and servants; two parlors and rooms for the owner. The second story had rooms for guests on both sides.

The Dutton Hotel was located on the original El Camino Real or King's Highway, which followed the trail of the Portolá expedition of 1769. It became the center for the settlement of Jolon, California. Other buildings included a dance hall, a jail, two blacksmith shops, and school. Five miles to the west was the Mission San Antonio de Padua, founded by Franciscan Fathers in 1771. Stagecoachs would often stop at the hotel and station to rest or change their horses and travelers would spend the night. Visitors included vaqueros, teamsters, soldiers, miners, settlers, trappers, cattlemen and the bandito Tiburcio Vásquez. Nationalities included Indian, Spanish, Mexican and American.

The General Store was next to the hotel and was called "Jolon Station", which was the chief supplier of foodstuffs, clothing, building supplies and whatever people needed. It had a saloon in the rear of the building with a fireplace, an ornate bar and six poker tables. Miners from the Los Burros Mining District in the Santa Lucia Mountains and families who lived in Pacific Valley and other coastal areas would visit the hotel twice a year to enjoy the hospitality of the Duttons for a few days and gather supplies for their mines and ranches. The first post office in Jolon was located at the general store.

Although the hotel operated from 1850 until 1929, its heyday was from 1875 until 1910. In 1910, when US-101 was rerouted to bypass Jolon by nearly twenty miles, the town became a ghost town within a few years. Dutton's son, Edwin Julian Dutton (1870-1921), took over management of the hotel when he was 21. He died in 1921. In 1929, the hotel was sold to William Randolph Hearst by the Dutton's widow, to become part of Fort Hunter Liggett. George Dutton and other members of his family are buried at the Jolon Cemetery. Hearst removed the surrounding buildings and his hope was to restore the adobe in the old mission style and turn it into a museum, but it never materialized.

In 1940, the United States Army acquired the property and the adobe was used as a recreation center and temporary camp. From 1950 to 1960, the building began to deteriorate. On August 16, 1969, the Monterey County surveyors and engineers surveyed the historic site. The roof had caved in the walls looked like they would not last the winter. On October 14, 1971, the Dutton Hotel was listed on the National Register of Historic Places.

Today, visitors can still see what remains of the adobe hotel. A kiosk and sign stands in front of the remaining adobe bricks and protective structure that are in decay.

Gallery

See also
 National Register of Historic Places listings in Monterey County, California

References

External links
 Dutton Hotel, Stagecoach Station
 The Monterey County Historical Society

Farms on the National Register of Historic Places in California
Unincorporated communities in Monterey County, California
Unincorporated communities in California